Palmadusta clandestina is a species of sea snail, a cowry, a marine gastropod mollusk in the family Cypraeidae, the cowries.

Subspecies
Palmadusta clandestina candida (Pease, 1865)
Palmadusta clandestina clandestina (Linnaeus, 1767)
Palmadusta clandestina passerina  Melvill, 1888

Description
Palmadusta clandestina has the flat-sided egg shape typical of cowries, and is around 26 mm long. In a defence mechanism reminiscent of some other acid-producing cowries, this species secretes sulphuric acid when disturbed.

Distribution
This species is distributed in the Red Sea and in the Indian Ocean along Aldabra, Chagos, the Comores, Kenya, Madagascar, the Mascarene Basin, Mauritius, Réunion, the Seychelles, Somalia and Tanzania

References

 Verdcourt, B. (1954). The cowries of the East African Coast (Kenya, Tanganyika, Zanzibar and Pemba). Journal of the East Africa Natural History Society 22(4) 96: 129–144, 17 pls
 Drivas, J. & M. Jay (1988). Coquillages de La Réunion et de l'île Maurice

Cypraeidae
Gastropods described in 1767
Taxa named by Carl Linnaeus